Spectrum (스펙트럼) was a South Korean boy band formed by WYNN Entertainment. Their lineup at the time of their disbandment consisted of six members: Minjae, Jaehan, Hwarang, Villain, and Eunjun. Originally a seven-piece group, member Dongyoon died on July 27, 2018, of undisclosed causes. They were planned to debut in October 2017, however, it was delayed due to their participation in Mix Nine. They officially debuted on May 10, 2018 with "Be Born". The group disbanded on July 10, 2020 due to the company's worsening situation caused by the COVID-19 pandemic in South Korea.

Members
Former
Dongyoon (동윤) - main rapper
Minjae (민재) - leader, vocalist
Donggyu (동규) - vocalist
Jaehan (재한) - main vocalist
Hwarang (화랑) - rapper
Villain (빌런) - rapper
Eunjun (은준) - vocalist

Discography

Extended plays

Single albums

Digital singles

References

K-pop music groups
South Korean boy bands
South Korean dance music groups
Musical groups from Seoul
Musical groups established in 2018
Musical groups disestablished in 2020
2018 establishments in South Korea
2020 disestablishments in South Korea
South Korean pop music groups
Music groups disestablished due to the COVID-19 pandemic